Bishop Turner may refer to:

William Turner (bishop of Buffalo) bishop of the Diocese of Buffalo, New York from 1919 to 1936
Francis Turner (1638?-1700), 47th Bishop of Ely
Henry McNeal Turner (1833-1915), a bishop of the African Methodist Episcopal Church
William Turner, first Bishop of Salford from 1851 to 1872